The Stadttempel, also called the Seitenstettengasse Temple, is the main synagogue of Vienna, Austria. It is located in the Innere Stadt 1st district, at Seitenstettengasse 4.

History
The synagogue was constructed from 1824 to 1826. The luxurious Stadttempel was fitted into a block of houses and hidden from plain view of the street, because of an edict issued by Emperor Joseph II that only Roman Catholic places of worship were allowed to be built with facades fronting directly on to public streets.

This edict saved the synagogue from total destruction during the Kristallnacht in November 1938, since the synagogue could not be destroyed without setting on fire the buildings to which it was attached. The Stadttempel was the only synagogue in the city to survive World War II, as Nazi paramilitary troops with the help of local authorities destroyed all of the other 93 synagogues and Jewish prayer-houses in Vienna, starting with the Kristallnacht.

In August 1950, the coffins of Theodor Herzl and his parents were displayed at the synagogue, prior to their transfer for reburial in Israel.

In the 1981 Vienna synagogue attack, two people from a bar mitzvah ceremony at the synagogue were murdered and thirty injured when Palestinian Arab terrorists attacked the synagogue with machine guns and hand grenades.

Today the synagogue is the main house of prayer for the Viennese Jewish Community of about 7,000 members.

The synagogue has been declared a historic monument.

On 2 November 2020, a terrorist attack near the synagogue left four civilians dead and 23 others wounded. It was not immediately certain if the synagogue was the target of the attack.

Architecture

The synagogue was designed in elegant Biedermeier style by the Viennese architect Joseph Kornhäusel, architect to Johann I Joseph, Prince of Liechtenstein, for whom he had built palaces, theaters and other buildings.  Construction was supervised by the official municipal architect, Jacob Heinz.

Two five-story apartment houses, Numbers 2 and 4 Seitenstettengasse, were built at the same time as the synagogue, designed by the architect to screen the synagogue from the street in compliance with the Patent of Toleration, which permitted members of tolerated faiths to  worship in clandestine churches, but not in buildings with facades on public streets.    The synagogue is structurally attached to the apartment building at # 4 Seitenstettengasse.

The synagogue itself is in the form of an oval.  A ring of twelve Ionic columns support a two-tiered women's gallery.  Originally, the galleries ended one column away from the Torah Ark, they were later extended to the columns beside the ark to provide more seating.   the building is domed and lit by a lantern in the center of the dome, in classic Biedermeyer style.

A commemorative glass made at the time of the synagogue's dedication and etched with a detailed image of the synagogue's interior is now in the collection of the Jewish Museum (New York).

The synagogue underwent renovation in 1895 and again in 1904 by the Jewish architect Wilhelm Stiassny, adding considerable ornamentation, and, in the opinion of architectural historian Rachel Wischnitzer, "the serene harmony of the design was spoiled by renovations." Damage inflicted on Kristallnacht was repaired in 1949.  The "Stadttempel" was renovated once again in 1963 by Prof. Otto Niedermoser.

Famous members 
 Simon Wiesenthal
  Adolf Jellinek

See also 
 History of the Jews in Vienna
 History of the Jews in Austria
 Leopoldstädter Tempel

References

External links

 The Stadttempel, Vienna

Ashkenazi Jewish culture in Austria
Ashkenazi synagogues
Synagogues completed in 1826
Orthodox Judaism in Austria
Orthodox synagogues
Synagogues in Vienna
Regency and Biedermeier synagogues
Round and octagonal synagogues
 
Buildings and structures in Innere Stadt
Jewish Austrian history
1826 establishments in the Austrian Empire
Aesopian synagogues
19th-century architecture in Austria